Frederick Gough School is a community secondary school in Scunthorpe, England, for approximately 1,300 pupils aged from 11 to 16.

History

Grammar school
For two years, before it opened, the selected group of 110 were taught at Riddings Secondary School. The Ashby Grammar School (AGS) school badge was designed by the Art mistress, Miss M Balmford, in navy and light blue, with a Knights Templar motif; the Knights Templars was connected to Bottesford, Lincolnshire. It would cost £186,000 in 1958.Lindsey Education Committee wanted to call it Bottesford Grammar School, and the Scunthorpe education divisional body wanted to call it Queen's Grammar School, there would be 17 teachers, and construction would be finished by June 1960. There would be about 350, on the roll, from ages 11–14, with laboratories for physics, chemistry and biology. A sixth form would be in place by 1962. The school was built by R M Phillips & Sons of Brigg, with bricks from Crowle Works. The headteacher was 41 year old Mr John Tookey, the former deputy head, and head of English, of John Leggott Grammar School. The grammar school opened on Tuesday 6 September 1960, and would cost £273,000.

The grammar school was renamed Frederick Gough Grammar School after Alderman Frederick Gough, the first Chairman of Governors of the school. In November 1960, it was decided to rename the school, as Mr Gough had recently died. Frederick Herbert Baker Gough died aged 77 on Wednesday 5 October 1960 in Scunthorpe War Memorial Hospital. He came from Cardiff, and before the war he had been chief engineer of the Norman by Park steel works. He had been awarded the OBE in the 1943 Birthday Honours. His funeral was on Saturday 8 October 1960 at Ashby Wesley Church, later being buried in Bottesford churchyard.

Sir Charles Morris, vice-chancellor of University of Leeds since 1948, was chosen to open the new school in early 1961.

Comprehensive
It became a comprehensive school in 1968 following the introduction of the Comprehensive School system by the Labour Government in 1965. The first intake of pupils in the new system started in September 1968 and were split with half (co-ed) attending the Frederick Gough School and half (co-ed) going to the Ashby Girls Secondary School.

Curriculum
Frederick Gough school has been known as a "Specialist Languages College", but that title was recently disowned. The school teaches French (higher set only, excluding GCSE option) and Spanish.

In 2014 the school benefited from BSF (Building Schools for the Future), a programme introduced by the Labour government. From this it received new toilets, a 3G Sports Pitch, a new sports block and hall and a new English block.

Notable former pupils
 Sir Peter Birkett

References

1960 establishments in England
Community schools in the Borough of North Lincolnshire
Educational institutions established in 1960
Secondary schools in the Borough of North Lincolnshire
Schools in Scunthorpe